True Confessions  is a noir novel by John Gregory Dunne and published in 1977. The novel was inspired by an actual event, the 1947 Black Dahlia murder.

Plot 

Los Angeles, 1946: Lois Fazenda is found cut in two pieces in a vacant lot after the murderer has taunted on the corpse. Due to the nickname "The Virgin Tramp", given to her just to please a journalist, a "nice quiet little homicide that would have drifted off the front pages in a couple of days" becomes the center of a storm. Two brothers, Tom and Desmond Spellacy, are the protagonists of this corrosive romance of Irish-Catholic life in California shortly after World War II. Tom is a lieutenant of the Homicide Division in charge of the case, not very honest but good in his job, and Desmond is a skillful and quickly ascending monsignor who has already been chosen to become the next bishop. The investigation offers the background to narrate with ironic and vulgar language, full of racist and homophobic terms, the miseries and the hypocrisy of society. The world of the Spellacy brothers is made of gangsters and bigoted, perverts and unlucky people, golfers and prostitutes, priests with a questionable morality and businessmen with no morality at all, whose stories are united together in a plot of corruption and despair in which very few of them will have something to earn: the murder of the "Virgin Tramp" is a crime that has no solutions, only victims.

Main characters 
Lieutenant Tom Spellacy
 Monsignor Desmond Spellacy
 Lois Fazenda, prostitute and victim of the crime
 Jack Amsterdam, a gangster in business with the Los Angeles Archdiocese
Lieutenant Frank Crotty, colleague and friend of Tom Spellacy
 Cardinal Hugh Danaher, head of the Archdiocese, of whom Des Spellacy is the secretary and designated  successor
 Mary Margaret Maher Spellacy, wife of Tom Spellacy
 Corinne Morris, lover of Tom Spellacy
 Monsignor Seamus Fargo, honest and uncompromising priest, and for this reason hated by his superiors
 Dan T. Campion, lawyer of the Archdiocese
 Sonny McDonough, Los Angeles Construction Councilor and mortician in business with the Archdiocese
 Brenda Samuels, a brothel-keeper, friend of Tom Spellacy
 Captain Fred Fuqua, chief of the Homicide Division, superior of Tom Spellacy and aspiring chief of the LAPD
 Howard Terkel, a journalist

Reception
True Confessions was a New York Times Best Seller. Novelist Thomas H. Cook included True Confessions among his list of 10 best mystery books, calling it "one of the most movingly redemptive novels I have ever read."

Adaptation 
The novel was adapted into the 1981 film True Confessions, directed by Ulu Grosbard and starring Robert De Niro and Robert Duvall. Dunne co-wrote the screenplay with his wife Joan Didion.

References 

1977 American novels
Novels set in the 1940s
Novels set in Los Angeles
American novels adapted into films
American crime novels
E. P. Dutton books
Novels based on actual events